James McCullough may refer to:

 James J. McCullough (born 1942), American politician in New Jersey
 James S. McCullough (1843–1914), American politician in Illinois
 Jim McCullough Sr. (1928–2012), American film director and producer